The Party for Democracy and Progress / Socialist Party is a political party in Burkina Faso (former Upper Volta).

It was founded in May 2001 by merger of the Party for Democracy and Progress with the Burkinabè Socialist Party.

In the parliamentary election held on 5 May 2002, the party won 7.5% of the popular vote and 10 out of 111 seats. In the presidential election of 13 November 2005, its candidate Ali Lankoandé won 1.74% of the popular vote.

The party won two seats in the 2007 parliamentary election.

In the 2010 presidential election, the PDP/PS candidate Ouampoussoga François Kaboré won .6% of the popular vote.

Former member parties of the Socialist International
Political parties established in 2001
Political parties in Burkina Faso
Social democratic parties in Burkina Faso